Robert George Collier Proctor (13 May 1868 – 6 September 1903), often published as R. G. C. Proctor, was an English bibliographer, librarian, book collector, and expert on incunabula and early typography.

Early life and education
Proctor was born in Budleigh Salterton, Devon on 13 May 1868, to Robert Proctor and Anne Tate, and was a distant relative of John Payne Collier. He earned a Bachelor of Arts degree in classics from Corpus Christi College, Oxford, in 1890. While at Oxford, where he was known for his book collection, Proctor's interest in antiquarian studies, archaeology, and bibliography grew and he compiled a catalogue of incunabula and early printed books in the library collection at Corpus Christi College. Proctor continued his studies of early printing at Oxford, cataloging incunabula at the Bodleian Library, New College and Brasenose College.

Professional life
Proctor joined the British Museum on 16 October 1893 as an assistant in the Department of Printed Books. He quickly became an expert on early typography and began describing every known European type fount used before 1520. Proctor rearranged all of the incunabula in the British Museum geographically by place of printing in what is known today as "Proctor order" and he compiled An Index to the Early Printed Books in the British Museum: From the Invention of Printing to the Year 1500 which was issued in four parts from 1898 to 1903. Proctor developed a Greek typeface based on type found in the Complutensian Polyglot Bible. Working with William Morris at the Kelmscott Press, Proctor grew interested in Icelandic literature and published translations of the Vápnfirðinga saga and the Laxdæla saga in 1902 and 1903, respectively.

Death
In August 1903 Proctor began a solo walking tour in the Austrian Alps. He left Pitztal on 5 September without a guide and was never heard from again. In December 1903 a judge granted an order presuming Proctor's death on 6 September of that year. His friend, Sydney Cockerell, speculated that Proctor may have committed suicide.

Legacy
After Proctor's death a memorial fund was established and used to collect and publish (in 1905) his Bibliographical Essays. The fund also provided for the compilation and publication of the three remaining parts of Proctor's index of early printed books covering the years 1501 to 1520. Even today, some large collections of incunabula are arranged in "Proctor order" ("This means that the books are arranged and described in order of country of origin, then of town, then of printer, in chronological order").

Bibliography

Selected writings of Robert Proctor:

Proctor, Robert (1904). Αἰσχυλου Ὀρεστεια [text of Aeschylus ... prepared by Robert Proctor]. London: Chiswick Press.

See also
 History of books

References

Further reading

 Downes, Michael (2011), People from the past: Robert Proctor (1868-1903). Retrieved on 27 December 2016.

1868 births
1903 deaths
Accidental deaths in Austria
Alumni of Corpus Christi College, Oxford
English antiquarians
English bibliographers
English book and manuscript collectors
English librarians
Incunabula
Employees of the British Library
People declared dead in absentia
People from East Devon District